Guillermo Brooke Naylor (4 September 1884 – 23 January 1976) was an Argentine polo player who competed in the 1924 Summer Olympics. In 1924 he was part of the Argentine polo team, which won the gold medal.

References

External links
Guillermo Naylor's profile at Sports Reference.com
Guillermo Naylor at North Isles Family History

1884 births
1976 deaths
Argentine people of British descent
Argentine polo players
Olympic polo players of Argentina
Polo players at the 1924 Summer Olympics
Olympic gold medalists for Argentina
Medalists at the 1924 Summer Olympics
Olympic medalists in polo